The Death of Bees is a 2013 debut novel by Lisa O'Donnell. The book was published on January 2, 2013, in the United Kingdom and United States by Windmill Books. Told through multiple viewpoints, and written in the present tense, The Death of Bees focuses on how the death of two local drug addicts affects their daughters Marnie and Nelly and the people around them. The novel won the 2013 Commonwealth Book Prize (Canada and Europe region).

Plot
After Marnie discovers the dead bodies of her parents, she and her sister decide against reporting the deaths to the police and instead bury their bodies. Reporting the death would mean social services stepping in and placing them in foster care. The sisters' lie about the disappearance of their parents is initially believed because their parents are considered unreliable drug addicts by many in the community. This lie is eventually uncovered by their homosexual neighbor Lennie, who takes them in and cares for them. Despite Lennie's care and kindness, Marnie and Nelly are both haunted by the ghosts of their past. Nelly wakes up screaming in the night because of memories of her father molesting her while Marnie drowns her sorrows by drinking, selling drugs, and sleeping with a married man. When their maternal grandfather discovers the situation and insists on taking the two girls in, Lennie becomes intent on keeping them by his side.

Reception
Critical reception for the book was positive, with The Scotsman praising the book. The Herald called the book "hard to put down" while Publishers Weekly also praised the book but found Nelly to be a "less believable character".

Recognition
2012 Anobii First Book Award, nominated  for The Death of Bees 
2013 Commonwealth Book Prize, overall winner for The Death of Bees
2014 Alex Award

References

External links
 Lisa O'Donnell's page, Conville and Walsh literary agency
 REVIEW : Closed Doors by Lisa O'Donnell at Upcoming4.me

2013 British novels
Novels about death
2013 debut novels
Heinemann (publisher) books